The Kolkata Metro is a rapid transit system serving the city of Kolkata in West Bengal, India. , it has three operational lines, a  line from Dakshineswar to Kavi Subhash , a  line from Salt Lake Sector V to Sealdah,
and a
Three other lines are in various phases of construction. The system has a mix of underground, at-grade and elevated stations using both broad-gauge and standard-gauge tracks. Trains operate between 06:55 and 22:30 IST and the fares range from ₹5 to ₹25.

The Kolkata Metro is the first planned and operational rapid transit system in India. It was initially planned in the 1920s, but construction started in the 1970s. The first underground stretch, from Bhawanipore (now Netaji Bhawan) to Esplanade, opened in 1984. A truncated section of Line 2, or the East–West Corridor, from Salt Lake Sector V to Phoolbagan  opened in 2020. Line 3, or the Joka-Esplanade Corridor (currently truncated in Taratala), opened in 2022. It is the fifth-longest operational metro network in India after the Delhi Metro, Hyderabad Metro, Namma Metro and Chennai Metro.

Metro Railway, Kolkata and Kolkata Metro Rail Corporation are the owners and operator of the system. On 29 December 2010, Metro Railway, Kolkata, became the 17th zone of the Indian Railways, completely owned and funded by the Ministry of Railways. It is the only metro in the country to be controlled by Indian Railways. There are around 300 daily train trips carrying more than  passengers.

History

Early attempts 
In the September 1919 session of the Imperial Legislative Council at Shimla, a committee was set up by W. E. Crum that recommended a metro line for Kolkata (formerly Calcutta). This line was supposed to connect Bagmari in the east to Benaras Road, Salkia, in Howrah in the west via a tunnel beneath Hooghly River. The estimated construction costs were £3,526,154, about  based on current exchange rates, and the proposed deadline was 1925–1926. The tickets were priced at 3 annas ( 0.1875) for the full trip. Crum also mentioned a north–south corridor back then. An east–west metro railway connection, named the "East–West Tube Railway", was proposed for Kolkata in 1921 by Harley Dalrymple-Hay. All the reports can be found in his 1921 book Calcutta Tube Railways. However, in 1923, the proposal was not undertaken due to a lack of funds.

Planning 
The then Chief Minister of West Bengal, Bidhan Chandra Roy, reconceived the idea of an underground railway for Kolkata in the early 1949–1950. A survey was done by a team of French experts, but nothing concrete came of this. Efforts to solve problem traffic by augmenting the existing fleet of public transport vehicles hardly helped, since roads accounted for only 4.2 percent of the surface area in Kolkata, compared with 25 percent in Delhi and 30 percent in other cities. To find alternative solutions, the Metropolitan Transport Project (MTP) was set up in 1969. However, only three were selected for construction. These were:

 Dum Dum – Tollygunge (Line 1. Presently operates from  Dakshineswar to New Garia)
 Bidhannagar – Ramrajatala (Line 2. Presently truncated till Howrah Maidan)
 Dakshineswar – Thakurpukur (Divided into Line 1; Noapara to Dakshineswar and Line 3; Joka to Esplanade)

A tentative deadline was fixed to complete all the corridors by 1991.

Construction 

Since it was India's first metro and was constructed as a completely indigenous process, a traditional cut-and-cover method and driven shield tunneling was chosen and the Kolkata Metro was more of a trial-and-error affair, in contrast to the Delhi Metro, which saw the involvement of multiple international consultants. As a result, it took nearly 23 years to completely construct the  underground railway.

The foundation stone of the project was laid by Indira Gandhi, the Prime Minister of India, on 29 December 1972, and construction work started in 1973–74. Initially, cut and cover along with slurry wall construction to handle soft ground, was recommended by the Soviet Union Consultants. Later, in 1977, it was decided to adopt both shield tunneling and cut and cover methods for construction under populated areas, sewer lines, water mains, electrical cables, telephone cables, tram lines, canals etc. The technology was provided by M/s NIKEX Hungarian Co., Budapest. In the early days, the project was led by the Union Railway Minister from West Bengal, A. B. A. Ghani Khan Choudhury, often against the prevailing socio-political stance of his contemporaries in the West Bengal government. From the start of construction, the project had to contend with several problems including insufficient funds (until 1977–1978), a shifting of underground utilities, court injunctions, and an irregular supply of vital materials. In 1977, an injunction for the allocation of new funding was passed by the newly elected Jyoti Basu government.

The first metro was driven by Tapan Kumar Nath and Sanjoy Kumar Sil. The service was quickly followed by commuter services on another  stretch in the north between Dum Dum and Belgachhia on 12 November 1984. However, the services on the north section were suspended starting 26 October 1992, as this small, isolated section was little used. The Line 1 was almost entirely built by cut and cover method, while a small 1.09 km stretch between Belgachia and Shyambazar was built using shield tunneling with compressed air and air locks, since the alignment crossed a railway yard (now Kolkata railway station) and Circular Canal. 

After more than eight years, the  Belgachhia–Shyambazaar section, along with the Dum Dum–Belgachhia stretch, was opened on 13 August 1994. Another  stretch from Esplanade to Chandni Chowk was commissioned shortly afterwards, on 2 October 1994. The Shyambazaar-Shobhabazar–Girish Park and Chandni Chowk–Central sections were opened on 19 February 1995. Services on the entire stretch of the Metro were introduced from 27 September 1995 by bridging the  gap with Mahatma Gandhi Road metro station in the middle.

The section was constructed and opened in two phases, Mahanayak Uttam Kumar to Kavi Nazrul in 2009 and Kavi Nazrul to Kavi Subhash in 2010. In the north, the line was extended till Noapara from Dum Dum on 10 July 2013. The latest extension opened was the  stretch from Noapara to Dakshineswar on 23 February 2021.

East–West metro 
The master-plan of the metro corridor was made in 1971 along with the North–South Corridor, connecting the office district of Bidhannagar with the twin city and transportation hub Howrah via another transport hub of the city, Sealdah, and the central business district Esplanade by an underwater metro line. It is a  project, sanctioned in 2008 by Prime Minister Manmohan Singh. The foundation stone was laid on 22 February 2009 and construction started in March 2009. The autonomous Kolkata Metro Rail Corporation (KMRC) was formed to implement the project. The Government of India (Ministry of Urban Development) and Government of West Bengal each had a half-share in it. Later, the Government of West Bengal pulled out from it, and the shares were transferred to the Ministry of Railways.

Route realignment 

Chief Minister Mamata Banerjee proposed the politically controversial realignment of the East-West Corridor from Central to Esplanade in 2012, stating that the original plan would affect 250 shop-owners and tenants in the Lalbazar and Bowbazar area. The residents and traders of those areas started protests. KMRC and JICA requested the Government of West Bengal to stick to the original plan to avoid impacting the entire project. This was the first time in the country that a metro corridor alignment was being changed after preparation of DPR and sanction of the project. Despite opposition from the official agencies, the Government of West Bengal forcefully approved the route realignment in 2013. Later, KMRC said that the realignment would increase ridership and revenue by at least 30 percent.

The realignment led to many other issues and delays. Some of the biggest issues were the H-piles under Esplanade metro station and the Bowbazar mishap. As per the 1971 master plan, the East-West Corridor was supposed to pass under Central metro station, so the square foundational beams in Esplanade were not removed. Since the Tunnel Boring Machines (TBMs) cannot cut through steel, another small tunnel was dug using New Austrian tunnelling method (NATM) and the H-piles were cut manually. This extended the tunnelling process by one and a half months. In September 2019, during the construction of the eastbound tunnel (from Esplanade to Sealdah), a TBM hit an aquifer under Bowbazar, causing a major collapse in the area, delaying work in that section for several months. Around 80 houses were damaged and many buildings were declared unsafe, affecting more than 600 people. Later subsidence in the area was checked using grouting. Very recently, a fear has developed that the E-W metro tunnel running under the area may collapse. This is due to the soft soil of the area which is not fit for boring tunnels through it. The metro officials and the municipal corporation are currently looking into these problems.

Expansion planning 
By 2011–2012, the Railway Ministry had announced plans for the construction of five new metro lines and an extension of the existing north–south corridor. These were:

 Salt Lake – Howrah Maidan (Line 2 or East–West Metro Corridor)
 Joka – B.B.D. Bagh (Line 3. Later truncated till Esplanade)
 Noapara–Barasat (Line 4, via airport)
 Baranagar–Barrackpore (Line 5)
 New Garia – Dum Dum Airport (Line 6)

Major modifications 
A new four-platform interchange station was constructed at Noapara. This will act as an interchange station between Line 1 and Line 4. For the time being, only two platforms are in use, but once Line 4 is running, all four platforms will be operational. The existing Esplanade metro station is being upgraded and a subway is being constructed to the new metro station to provide an interchange among Line 1, Line 2 and Line 3. In 2009–2010, Line 1 underwent upgrades of services and amenities and many stations were renamed after famous personalities by then Minister of Railways Mamata Banerjee.

Network

Operational

Under construction/planned

Lines

Blue line (Line 1) 

Line 1, or the Blue line, of Kolkata Metro has a total length of  serving 26 stations, of which 15 are underground, 9 are elevated and 2 at-grade. It uses the  broad gauge tracks. It was the first underground railway to be built in India, with the first trains running in October 1984 and the full stretch that had been initially planned completed and operational by February 1995. The southward extension of Blue line to an elevated corridor from Tollygunge to New Garia was constructed and opened in two phases, Mahanayak Uttam Kumar to Kavi Nazrul in 2009 and Kavi Nazrul to Kavi Subhash in 2010. Another extension constructed was the  elevated corridor from Dum Dum to Noapara in 2013. The last  extension from Noapara to Dakshineswar opened in 2021, thus completing the Blue line.

The commercial operations for Dum Dum to Noapara was commissioned in March 2013, and construction from Noapara to Dakshineswar with an interchange with Line 5 at Baranagar is being executed by RVNL. This section is opened on 23 February 2021 for general public  with a projected ridership of 55,000 by 2030.

This could decrease the time interval between trains to just 90 seconds from 5 minutes. Indian Railways approved the proposal, and installation work is expected to be completed within 2–3 years.

Green line (Line 2) 

Green Line or Line 2, is the second metro corridor to connect Kolkata with Howrah by an underwater metro line below the Hooghly River. The length was supposed to be ,  underground and  elevated. However, the project was stalled several times due to land acquisition and slum relocation issues. The planned intersection with Blue line at Central was re-aligned to Esplanade (interchange with Blue line and Purple line). In September 2019, during the construction of the eastbound tunnel (from Esplanade to Sealdah), a TBM hit an aquifer under Bowbazar, causing a major collapse in the area, delaying work on that section for several months.

Between Mahakaran and Howrah Station, the metro will run under the Hooghly River – the biggest underwater metro in India. Transfer stations with railways will be located at Sealdah and Howrah. From VIP Road/Teghoria (Haldiram), passengers can take the Orange Line metro (VIP Road Station) to Biman Bandar.

The line from Salt Lake Sector V to Salt Lake Stadium was inaugurated on 13 February 2020 by the then Minister of Railways Piyush Goyal after 11 years of construction. Services to Phoolbagan metro station, the first underground station of the line, were extended on 4 October 2020. It was also the first underground station inaugurated in Kolkata after 25 years, since the Mahatma Gandhi Road metro station of Blue line was the last to open in 1995. The extension added  to the existing line.

Purple line (Line 3) 

Previously, the stretch from Thakurpukur to Majerhat was surveyed as a branch line of the circular railway, and a metro line from Majerhat to Dakshineswar via Sealdah (interchange with Green line) was planned. Later the route was truncated to Esplanade. The corridor runs along Diamond Harbour Road, Khidirpur Road and Jawaharlal Nehru Road, major arterial roads of Kolkata, and has passenger interchange facilities with Blue line at Esplanade. The proposed Esplanade station will not be the same as that of Blue line but a different station which will also serve Green line. The line now has a new depot in Joka. Due to land acquisition problems and objections from the Ministry of Defence, construction has been delayed several times since the beginning. Defence Ministry objected that the elevated corridor would overlook the Eastern Command headquarters at Fort William, Ordinance Depot at Mominpore. The work resumed in several phases and new bids were invited by Rail Vikas Nigam Limited (RVNL) in April 2020. It is India's first metro line to run on indigenous head hardened rails, manufactured by Jindal Steel & Power. The work is being executed by RVNL.

The line has 3 phases:

Joka to Taratala (Phase 1)
 Majerhat to Esplanade (Phase 2)
 Joka to Diamond Park (Phase 3)

The Mominpur metro station was planned to build across a 2500 sq. m area. However, the Ministry of Defence objected to the elevated structure, saying that it would overlook the Ordnance depot. This forced RVNL to stall the entire project, and RVNL almost dropped the station from the plan even though it alone would have a projected 20,000 passengers during peak hours. Underground Mominpur station was also not possible due to the sharp gradient from Taratala metro station. After a series of discussions and consultations with the Ministry of Defence and Government of West Bengal in 2016, it was decided to shift the station around  northward, near the Alipore Bodyguard Lines. But, after a year Defence Ministry approved the Mominpur metro station in its original location as the change in alignment would have delayed the project and budget overrun. It will be the last elevated station of the corridor. Now, the proposed underground Khidirpur metro station is planned at the Alipore Bodyguard Lines. There were also hurdles regarding clearance for tunneling under defence lands. In 2020, Defence Ministry eased out the process as lease rent wasn't required anymore for tunneling until overground ownership of the land does not change.

Yellow line (Line 4) 

The work of integrating the Circular Railway from Dum Dum to Biman Bandar into a  new metro line from Dum Dum to Netaji Subhash Chandra Bose International Airport was sanctioned in the 2010–2011 budget. The work on this project from Noapara to Barasat is being executed by Metro Railway, Kolkata.

Following an objection from the Airports Authority of India (AAI), the route was further reworked. Instead of using the Circular Line's Jessore Road and Biman Bandar railway station, Jessore Road and Jai Hind metro station were planned at-grade and underground, respectively. This stretch will continue underground till Barasat after Prime Minister Narendra Modi's nod, which was till New Barrackpore earlier. Another station was proposed at Michael Nagar. Some reports say that the Noapara–Barasat line will terminate at Jai Hind and the Orange line would continue till Barasat.

Pink line (Line 5) 

The Pink Line is the northward extension from Baranagar to Barrackpore []. This line was meant to enable a quick commute from the northernmost suburbs to South Kolkata. The work corridor is being executed by RVNL. As of May 2021, no physical construction has commenced, and the project has been stalled as metro construction would affect the water pipelines along Barrackpore Trunk Road. To avoid this, another proposal was made to continue this line through the Kalyani Expressway. Eleven metro stations were planned on this route.

Orange line (Line 6) 

A connection between New Garia and Netaji Subhas Chandra Bose International Airport via EM Bypass, Salt Lake and Rajarhat-New Town was sanctioned to reduce travel time between the southern fringes of Kolkata and the airport. Work on this line was inaugurated by the then Railway Minister Mamata Banerjee on 7 February 2011 with a project deadline of six years. The work is executed by Rail Vikas Nigam Limited. Jai Hind metro station will also have a stabling yard, and will be the largest underground facility in the country. This line will have interchanges at Kavi Subhash (with Blue line); Salt Lake Sector V (with Green line) and Teghoria/VIP Road (again with Green line). In July 2020, bids were invited by RVNL to complete the sections left due to various reasons and hurdles.

Initially, the Jai Hind metro station was planned to be elevated. However, the AAI objected that the elevated stretch up to the airport might pose a threat to aircraft, so the route was further reworked and the station was shifted underground, 150 m from the Airport terminal building. As per another revised plan, this line will continue till Barasat and the Yellow line would terminate at Jai Hind. There are also possibilities that Jai Hind metro station would serve as a junction of three lines, i.e. Noapara–Jai Hind, Kavi Subhash–Jai Hind and Jai Hind–Barasat.

Proposed expansions
In 2012, RITES, surveyed 16 new routes for connecting the suburban areas to the city. The key routes were:

 Majerhat to Ruby via Kalighat and Ballygunge
 Joka to Mahanayak Uttam Kumar via Thakurpukur
 Basirhat to Mahanayak Uttam Kumar, Kavi Subhash via Haroa and Bhangar
 Kavi Subhash to Canning via Rajpur-Baruipur & Uttarbhag along with EM Bypass
 Joka to Diamond Harbour along Diamond Harbour Road (Line 3 extension)
 Barasat to Barrackpore via State Highway 2 (Line 4 extension)
 Barrackpore to Kalyani via Kalyani Expressway (Line 4/ Line 5 extension)
 Madhyamgram to Barrackpore via Sodepur Road and Kalyani Expressway
 Branch line of Line 2 from Karunamoyee to Kolkata station
 Howrah Maidan – Shalimar – Santragachi via Kona Expressway and Foreshore Road (Line 2 extension)
 Santragachi to Dhulagarh (Line 2 extension)
 Howrah Maidan to Dankuni via Ichapur Road and Benaras Road
 Howrah Maidan to Srirampore via Dankuni, National Highway 2
 Howrah Maidan to Belur

Owners and operators 
Since the formation of the Metropolitan Transport Project (MTP) in 1969, Kolkata Metro has always been under the Indian Railways, directly or indirectly. It is the only metro in the country to be controlled by Indian Railways. On 29 December 2010, Metro Railway, Kolkata, became the 17th zone of the Indian Railways, completely owned and funded by the Ministry of Railways. Although Kolkata Metro Rail Corporation was formed with 50-50 shares of the Government of West Bengal and the Government of India, as the implementing agency of the East–West Corridor, later majority shares were transferred to Indian Railways. In July 2019, the operation of Green line was handed over to Metro Railway, Kolkata.

Services

Operations 

Originally, There are a total of 358 services every day. But, the services and timings were changed due to the COVID-19 pandemic and as of July 2022, it operates between 06:55 and 22:30 IST. All stations have display boards showing the terminating station, current time, scheduled time of arrival and estimated time of arrival of trains in Bangla, Hindi and English. Digital countdown clocks are also present in the stations. The coaches have line route-maps and speakers and displays, which provide details of upcoming stations in the three languages. Navigation information is available on Google Maps. Kolkata Metro has launched its own official mobile app Metro Railway, Kolkata for android smartphone users which provides information regarding station, train timing, fare and has online smart card recharge facility.

Seat reservation 
In 2008, the Kolkata Metro Railway experimented with the practice of reserving two entire compartments for women. This system was found to be ineffective and caused inconvenience for a lot of commuters (including women) and the plan was dropped.

Now, certain sections of seats in each compartment are reserved for women, senior citizens and the physically challenged. The four-seat sections at each end of a coach are reserved for senior citizens and the physically challenged, and the two middle seat sections, between the general seat sections on each side, are reserved for women.

Fare 
The fare is based on the predetermined distance formulas.

Tokens 

After using the magnetic ticketing strip system from 1984 to 2011, Kolkata Metro introduced Radio-Frequency Identification (RFID) tokens by Centre for Railway Information Systems (CRIS) in partnership with Keltron in August 2011. The old magnetic strip reader gates were replaced with new RFID readers.

Smart Card 
After introducing RFID tokens, Kolkata metro introduced a Smart Card service provided by CRIS. Earlier, four different types of smart cards were used: Minimum Multi Ride (MMR), Limited Multi Ride (LMR), General Multi Ride (GMR) and Extended Multi Ride (EMR). They were withdrawn on 7 November 2013 and a single type of Smart Card (General Smart Card) was introduced. Two new types of Tourist Smart Cards were also introduced (Tourist Smart Card – I and Tourist Smart Card – II). The card is common for both Blue line and Green line. Online smart card recharge facility was launched on 1 July 2020.

Tourist Smart Card 
Two new types of Tourist Smart Cards were also introduced (Tourist Smart Card – I and Tourist Smart Card – II). This type of smart card is for tourists and have unlimited rides.

Durga Puja special services 

The metro railway runs special night-long services during Durga Puja (Maha Saptami to Maha Navami) to help people travel faster and more conveniently for pandal-hopping. The services start at 13:00 and operate till 04:00 the next day. Pre-puja services are also run.

Security 

All stations are equipped with closed-circuit cameras, metal detectors and baggage scanners. The Railway Protection Force provides security in the premises. Smoking is strictly prohibited in the metro premises. All stations in the Green line have half-height and full-height platform screen doors for elevated and underground stations, respectively.

Other facilities 
All stations have televisions which telecast news and songs. WiFi was introduced at Park Street and Maidan metro station in 2016. Gradually, it was expanded to all the stations. The service is provided by Reliance Jio.

Most stations have services such as ATMs, food outlets and chemist stalls. To ease crowding for recharging smart cards, two Automatic Card recharge machines were installed at Dum Dum. On account of the Swacchota–i–Seba (in English, Cleanliness is service), a nationwide awareness and mobilization campaign on cleanliness, plastic bottle crushers were placed at multiple stations.

Ridership 
Kolkata Metro is the 2nd busiest metro system in India. 2,465 travel by every Metro train in Kolkata against 1,110 in Delhi. Kolkata Metro carries around 7,00,000 people daily. The daily and annual ridership has consistently risen since 1984. After the completion of the whole corridor from Dum Dum to Mahanayak Uttam Kumar in 1995, there was a huge leap in ridership. Low fares and fast and convenient travel have contributed to the high ridership figures.

The Green Line sees around 40,000 people daily, with the Sealdah extension being operational from July 14, 2022.

The Purple Line sees around 2,000 people daily, being operational from January 2, 2023.

Infrastructure

Rolling stock 

The rolling stock of Blue line uses  broad gauge, a broad gauge track manufactured by Integral Coach Factory, Chennai (ICF), and the electrical components are manufactured by NGEF, Bengaluru. Initially, the rolling stock fleet was composed of four-car rakes. Over the years there has been considerable expansion to the network, both underground and on elevated sections. With the increase in traffic, an eight-car rake formation has become standard.

Depots and yards 

There are four operational depots. The Noapara, Tollygunge and New Garia depots serve the Blue line, while the Central Park depot serves the Green line. A depot at Joka for Purple line and a yard at Airport for Yellow line are under construction.

Stations and electrification 
Kolkata Metro has 40 stations, of which 17 are underground, 21 are elevated and 2 are at grade. Currently, Noapara is the largest metro station in the system and it will be the interchange station for Blue line and Yellow line. The under-construction Howrah metro station is the deepest metro station in India. The standard length of platforms in Kolkata Metro is 170 m. The metro stations of Gitanjali and Netaji have the shortest platforms of 163 m. Since the Kolkata Metro has  electrification, electricity substations were built in Jatin Das Park, Central and Shyambazar. The tracks are ballastless with M1A track fittings.

Signalling and telecommunication 
Trains operate on typical Indian Railways automatic signalling technology. A Route Relay Interlocking System has been provided at New Garia depot and Tollygunge depot and Electronic Interlocking has been provided at Noapara depot to facilitate the prompt withdrawal and injection of rakes and to perform shunting operations inside the car shed for maintenance purposes. The Train Protection and Warning System (TPWS) is provided throughout the Metro Railway. It is designed to prevent collisions caused by human (operator) error. A Train Describer System and Auto Train Charting are used to help the operation control centre monitor and plan train movement on a real-time basis. An Integrated Power Supply System and Microprocessor based Data Logger System have also been provided. An integrated system of STM-1 and STM-4 optical fibre cable is used for all telecommunication, signalling, SCADA and other circuits in Blue line. The service is provided by RailTel.

In August 2019, Indian Railways gave a go-ahead to the proposal, and installation work is supposed to be complete within 2–3 years.

Unlike the previous line, the Green line adopted the more advanced Communications Based Train Control system. It has cab signalling and a centralised automatic train control system consisting of automatic operation, protection  and signalling modules. The signalling system is provided by Italy-based company Ansaldo STS. The other signalling equipment includes an integrated system with fibre optic cable, SCADA, radios, and a public-address system.

Public address system 
PA systems are present at all stations and their premises. A station master can make a necessary announcement to the passengers and staff, overriding the ongoing local announcement. Train PA systems are controlled by the motormen for announcements to passengers on the particular train.

Issues 
Since Kolkata Metro was constructed in the 1970s, there were some technical limitations. Due to the tunnel dimensions, and being under Indian Railways, Kolkata Metro opted for Indian metre gauge shell (2.7 m width) mounted upon  broad gauge bogies. The rakes have to be custom built and require a special assembly line involving additional costs thus limiting the options for rake manufacturers for Blue line. From its inception, the coaches were manufactured by ICF, which lacked the pre-requisite knowledge for manufactured non-air-conditioning rakes. The 3000 and 4000 series rakes were faulty and delivered without any trials. In addition, Indian Railways signalling is used instead of European signalling. All of these factors have led to snags, delays and accidents.

Unlike Delhi Metro, Kolkata Metro is owned and operated by Indian Railways instead of an autonomous body, and it relies solely on Indian Railways for every decision, from funding to route realignment. The founder of Delhi Metro, E. Sreedharan, said Indian Railways are not experts at urban transport and misplanned the Kolkata Metro from the beginning, and he felt that a private company should run the metro and could bring it up to standard in five years.

Network map

See also 

 Urban rail transit in India
 Transport in Kolkata
 List of Kolkata metro depots and yards
 List of Kolkata metro stations
 Kolkata Suburban Railway
 Trams in Kolkata
 List of rapid transit systems
 List of metro systems
 List of suburban and commuter rail systems
 Zones and divisions of Indian Railways

Notes

References

External links

 Metro Railway Kolkata
Kolkata Metro Rail Corporation

 
Underground rapid transit in India
Railway lines opened in 1984
Standard gauge railways in India
5 ft 6 in gauge railways in India
750 V DC railway electrification
Rail transport in Kolkata
Rail transport in West Bengal
Transport in Kolkata